Léopold Henri Amyot, CVO, FRHSC (hon) is a former Canadian diplomat and public servant. During his diplomatic his career, he served as the Canadian Ambassador Extraordinary and Plenipotentiary to Iraq, Jordan, Lebanon, Syria and Morocco.  He served as Secretary to the Governor General of Canada and Herald Chancellor of Canada from 1988 to 1990.

External links 
 Foreign Affairs and International Trade Canada Complete List of Posts

References

Year of birth missing (living people)
Living people
Ambassadors of Canada to Syria
Ambassadors of Canada to Iraq
Ambassadors of Canada to Jordan
Ambassadors of Canada to Lebanon
Ambassadors of Canada to Morocco
Commanders of the Royal Victorian Order